Kazuhiko Hattori (服部和彦 Hattori Kazuhiko, born in 1944) is Japanese composer, music critic and music producer.

Career
Born in 1944. Graduated from Nihon University (Department of Technology) in 1966.  During the years 1976-1977, he visited Asia, the Middle East, and Africa to pursue his study of ethnic music.  Centered on chamber music, his compositions range from solo, orchestral works, to music for the plays.  His works of composition have been performed overseas; in the music festivals in Asia and Europe, and broadcast on the media. His chamber music compositions have been presented at the Festival of Asia Composers League seven times. 
Several ensembles and orchestras have requested for his compositions, and he has dedicated some works for them.

As a music producer, he has produced Japan Contemporary Music Festival, 21st Century Chorus Festival, and series of performances of contemporary music from overseas.  Over 40 years, he has studied East Asian philosophy, psychology, physics, biology, and his interdisciplinary research has been continued.  Also, he has his career as a lecturer and a critic and as Chairman of the Japan International League of Artists, and head judge of the Tokyo International Competition for Chamber Music Composition and JILA Music Competition.

Compositions
Color of Rain (for flute) (雨の彩 Ame no Aya) 
Seasons (for pianoforte) (シーズン) 
Memories of waves (for violin,clarinet,pianoforte) (波の記憶 Nami no Kioku)
My ears are... (for narrarion and music) (私の耳は... Watashi no Mimi wa)
After the Dark 2 (for string quartet) (アフター・ザ・ダークII) 
Time of repeating wind (piano concerto)　(巡る風のとき Meguru Kaze no toki)
Wind of Iris (a capella chorus) (イリスの風 Iris no Kaze)"
Mizar (for marimba)　(ミザール Mizar)Pleiades (for soprano and string orchestra) (プレアデス Pleiades)Epitaph (エピターフ Epitaph)''

References
kouenirai.com　Koenirai.com(Japanese)
Japan International League of Artists (Japanese)

Specific

1944 births
20th-century Japanese composers
21st-century Japanese composers
Japanese male composers
Japanese music critics
Japanese record producers
Living people
20th-century Japanese male musicians
21st-century Japanese male musicians